A keyboard percussion instrument, also known as a bar or mallet percussion instrument, is a pitched percussion instrument arranged in a similar pattern to a piano keyboard and played with hands or percussion mallets. While most keyboard percussion instruments are fully chromatic, keyboard instruments for children, such as ones used in the Orff Schulwerk, may be diatonic or pentatonic.

Despite the name, keyboard instruments such as the celesta and keyboard glockenspiel are not considered keyboard percussion, owing to the different skills required to play them. These instruments are percussion instruments in most senses but are part of the keyboard section rather than the percussion section of an orchestra. Keyboard percussion instruments do not possess keyboards as such, but instead follow the arrangement of the keyboard.

Keyboard percussion instruments include marimba, xylophone, vibraphone, glockenspiel, and tubular bells.

Current Manufacturers
 Yamaha Percussion
 Adams Musical Instruments
 Majestic Percussion
 Premier Percussion
Musser Mallet Company

See also
 Classification of percussion instruments

References

 
Pitched percussion instruments